Stefka Georgieva Kostadinova (born 25 March 1965) is a Bulgarian former athlete who competed in the high jump. Her world record of 2.09 metres has stood since 1987. She is the 1996 Olympic champion, a two-time World champion, and a five-time World Indoor champion. She has been the president of the Bulgarian Olympic Committee since 2005.

Early career
Born in Plovdiv, Kostadinova went to a specialist sports school, but was only introduced to high jump in a Year Six (12–13 year olds) athletics meet in Sofia, on a day she is quoted as saying she would never forget (on TransWorldSport interview in 2012). She jumped  and was informed that it was a world record for her age group; and the same mark as the adult female world record in 1941.

Career

Kostadinova is the reigning world record holder in the women's high jump at 2.09 m, which she jumped during the 1987 World Championships in Athletics in Rome. Her world record is one of the oldest in modern athletics. Altogether Kostadinova set seven world records - three outdoors and four indoors. She also holds the distinction of having jumped over 2.00 m 197 times.

Kostadinova won the gold medal in the 1996 Summer Olympics in Atlanta, setting an Olympic record of 2.05 m. She also won a silver medal at the 1988 Summer Olympics in Seoul. Kostadinova won the outdoor World Championships in 1987 and 1995. She won the World Indoor Championship five times between 1985 and 1997. Kostadinova also won gold in all European Championships in Athletics in which she competed. She was a European outdoor champion in Stuttgart in 1986 and a four-time European indoor champion in 1985, 1987, 1988, and 1994.

Kostadinova was voted Sportsperson of the Year in Bulgaria four times (1985, 1987, 1995 and 1996).

Personal life
In 1995 Kostadinova gave birth to her son, Nikolay, just several months before winning gold in the 1995 World Championships in Athletics. In 1999 she divorced her long-standing husband and coach, Nikolay Petrov. The same year she officially put an end to her athletic career, though she had actually not participated in any major sports competition since the World Indoors Championship in 1997. In 2007 Kostadinova married businessman Nikolai Popvasilev.

Sports administration career
After retiring Kostadinova started a career in sports administration. She has served as vice president of the Bulgarian Athletic Federation, vice president of the Bulgarian Olympic Committee and was deputy sports minister of Bulgaria from 2003 through 2005.

On 11 November 2005, Kostadinova was elected president of the Bulgarian Olympic Committee. She replaced Ivan Slavkov, who was expelled by the International Olympic Committee for violating its standards in ethics.

International competitions

See also

Female two metres club

References

External links
 
 
 

1965 births
Living people
Bulgarian female high jumpers
World Athletics record holders
Sportspeople from Plovdiv
Athletes (track and field) at the 1988 Summer Olympics
Athletes (track and field) at the 1992 Summer Olympics
Athletes (track and field) at the 1996 Summer Olympics
Olympic athletes of Bulgaria
Olympic gold medalists for Bulgaria
Olympic silver medalists for Bulgaria
World Athletics Championships medalists
European Athletics Championships medalists
Eastern Orthodox Christians from Bulgaria
Medalists at the 1996 Summer Olympics
Medalists at the 1988 Summer Olympics
Olympic gold medalists in athletics (track and field)
Olympic silver medalists in athletics (track and field)
Goodwill Games medalists in athletics
World Athletics Indoor Championships winners
World Athletics Championships winners
Competitors at the 1986 Goodwill Games